Steinhorst may refer to the following places in Germany:

Steinhorst, Schleswig-Holstein, a municipality in the district of Lauenburg, Schleswig-Holstein 
Steinhorst, Lower Saxony, a municipality in the district of Gifhorn, Lower Saxony 
Steinhorst (Delbrück), part of the city Delbrück, in North Rhine-Westphalia